Typecasting is the process by which an actor is strongly identified with a specific character, role, or trait.

Typecast, typecasting, or type casting may also refer to:

 Type casting (computer programming), the act or result of changing an entity of one data type into another
 Type casting (typography), a technique for casting individual letters for use in printing presses
 Typecast (band), a Filipino band
 Typecast (horse), an American racehorse

See also
Stereotyping, similar to the acting concept